Acanthephyra is a genus of shrimp in the family Acanthephyridae, with species that live at depths from 0 to more than 5000 meters deep below the ocean surface.

Species 
 Acanthephyra acanthitelsonis Spence Bate, 1888
 Acanthephyra acutifrons Spence Bate, 1888
 Acanthephyra armata A. Milne-Edwards, 1881
 Acanthephyra brevicarinata Hanamura, 1984
 Acanthephyra brevirostris Smith, 1885
 Acanthephyra carinata Spence Bate, 1888
 Acanthephyra chacei Krygier & Forss, 1981
 Acanthephyra cucullata Faxon, 1893
 Acanthephyra curtirostris Wood-Mason & Alcock, 1891
 Acanthephyra eximia Smith, 1884
 Acanthephyra faxoni Calman, 1939
 Acanthephyra fimbriata Alcock & Anderson, 1894
 Acanthephyra indica Balss, 1925
 Acanthephyra kingsleyi Spence Bate, 1888
 Acanthephyra media Spence Bate, 1888
 Acanthephyra pelagica Risso, 1816
 Acanthephyra prionota Foxton, 1971
 Acanthephyra purpurea A. Milne-Edwards, 1881
 Acanthephyra quadrispinosa Kemp, 1939
 Acanthephyra rostrata Spence Bate, 1888
 Acanthephyra sanguinea Wood-Mason & Alcock, 1892
 Acanthephyra sibogae of Man, 1916
 Acanthephyra sica Spence Bate, 1888
 Acanthephyra smithi Kemp, 1939
 Acanthephyra stylorostratis Spence Bate, 1888
 Acanthephyra tenuipes Spence Bate, 1888
 Acanthephyra trispinosa Kemp, 1939

References 

Arthropod genera
Caridea